Monopoly: The Mega Edition is a special variant of the popular board game Monopoly. The game was first published on May 22, 2006 by Winning Moves Games USA in the USA. A UK version was adapted on October 1, 2007.

The game board is larger than that of regular Monopoly (30% bigger). The game now includes $/£1,000 bills, and it includes an option to build skyscrapers and train depots.

New board spaces

The Mega game board includes twelve new spaces. Eight of those new spaces are new properties (one for each color group) as follows (U.S. version):
 Browns: Arctic Avenue
 Light Blues: Massachusetts Avenue
 Maroons: Maryland Avenue
 Oranges: New Jersey Avenue
 Reds: Michigan Avenue
 Yellows: California Avenue
 Greens: South Carolina Avenue
 Dark Blues: Florida Avenue
NOTE: As with other US editions, the Mega Edition has changed the first Color Group from purple to brown with the recent reprints of the game.

In the UK Version the new properties are:
 Brown: Elephant and Castle
 Light Blue: Edgware Road
 Pink: Downing Street
 Orange: High Holborn
 Red: Aldwych
 Yellow: Shaftesbury Avenue
 Green: Saville Row
 Dark Blue: Knightsbridge

There is also a third Utility, the Gas Company, situated between Chance and Vermont Avenue/Pentonville.

The other three spaces are completely new to the board. Just after Jail/Just Visiting is the Auction space. If a player lands on this space while the bank still owns any properties, that player chooses one of the available properties to be auctioned off between the players (in similar fashion to regular property auctions). If the bank has no properties left to auction, the player that lands there then moves forward to the property on which they would have to pay the highest rent (the closest one, in case of a tie for highest amount).

The second space, Bus Ticket (located between Michigan Avenue/Aldwych and the B. & O. Railroad/Fenchurch Street Station), allows the player landing there to draw a Bus Ticket card, if any remain. If there are no Bus Ticket cards to draw, the space acts as a second FREE PARKING space and has no further effect.

The last of the three new spaces, Birthday Gift (located between Chance and Florida Avenue/Park Lane), gives the player that lands there a choice between taking $/£100 from the bank or drawing a Bus Ticket card. (If no Bus Ticket cards remain, the player automatically gets the $/£100.)

Differences in gameplay

Setup is the same as that of regular Monopoly, except that there is a new card deck to go along with the Chance and Community Chest cards called Bus Tickets, and players now receive $/£2,500 at the start of the game (adding one $/£1,000 bill) as opposed to the base $/£1,500 in regular Monopoly. (Earlier printings have silver-grey $1,000 bills; more recent printings have bright yellow $1,000s.)

On their turn, players roll all three dice (two regular dice plus the new Speed Die). Players move the total number of spaces as indicated by the three dice, or two dice if Mr. Monopoly or the Bus is rolled on the Speed Die. If doubles are rolled on the regular dice then the player may roll again as usual; if triples are rolled on the three dice then the player may move to any space on the board that they choose, but they do not roll again. They do not go to Jail if they roll doubles twice before rolling triples, and if they pass GO they collect $200 as usual. 

If Mr. Monopoly is rolled on the Speed Die, the player first moves the number of spaces indicated on the two regular dice and deals with the space they land on. If the player has not landed in Jail, they then move forward to the next unowned property, which they may then purchase or put up for auction. If there are no unowned properties, the player needs to move forward to the next property on which they would owe rent to another player. (If all other properties are mortgaged, the player does not move after making the initial move.)

A new alternative to rolling is using a Bus Ticket. If a player uses a Bus Ticket which they own, that player may advance to any space on the side of the board they are currently on. If a player rolls the Bus on the Speed Die, they can choose to either take a Bus Ticket(if any remain) or move forward to the next Chance/Community Chest space after the regular move. Bus Tickets are also obtained by landing on the Bus Ticket or Birthday Gift spaces. Some of the Bus Tickets cause all other Bus Tickets drawn but not played to expire, and thus be discarded. (This includes other Bus Tickets owned by the player who drew the expiration Ticket.)

Each color-group now contains an additional property, as does the group of Utilities (with the Gas Company). If a player owns the majority of properties in a color-group (2 of 3 in Purples/Browns or Dark Blues; 3 of 4 in other color groups), they may begin to build houses and hotels there, with rent doubled on any undeveloped properties. If they own all properties in a color-group, they may upgrade their hotels to Skyscrapers, which increase rent considerably (by $/£500 on First and Second Street properties, and by $/£1000 on Third and Fourth Streets) and charge triple rent on any unimproved properties. In the case of the Utilities, owning all 3 allows the owner to charge 20 times the dice roll (white dice only) of the opponent landing there. (Note: The Chance card that sends you to the nearest utility is not affected; you still only pay 10 times the new roll even if the owner owns all 3 utilities.)

Players can also build a train depot on any railroads which they own (the player does not need to own all 4 railroads) at a cost of $/£100. This doubles the rent on that railroad, or quadruples it if an opponent is sent there by one of the "Go To Nearest Railroad" Chance cards (twice the doubled railroad rent).

US edition board

NOTE: In recent printings of the game, the purple properties are now brown, like the UK edition below.

UK edition board

References

See also
Monopoly (game)
Parker Brothers
Rich Uncle Pennybags

Board games introduced in 2006
Roll-and-move board games
Economic simulation board games
Monopoly (game)
Multiplayer games